Afroccrisis is a genus of beetles in the family Cerambycidae, and contains the single species Afroccrisis perissinottoi. It was described by Vives in 2009.

References

Dorcasominae
Beetles described in 2009
Monotypic Cerambycidae genera